Anthony Mooyart (6 December 1698, Jaffna – 1 January 1767, Jaffna) was an acting Governor of Ceylon during the Dutch period in Ceylon. He was appointed on 13 May 1765 and was Governor until 7 August 1765. He was succeeded by Iman Willem Falck.

Mooyart was the son of Nicolaas Mooyart, of Galle, and Johanna van Eschweiler, both burghers from Ceylon.  Mooyart studied at Leiden University in the Netherlands. He married  Elizabeth Ursula Woutersz in 1725 in Jaffna. By 1739 he was an undermerchant and bookkeeper in Colombo, in 1743 a merchant in Batticaloa and by 1754 an administrator in Jaffna.

References

1698 births
1767 deaths
Governors of Dutch Ceylon
Leiden University alumni
People from Jaffna
Sri Lankan people of Dutch descent